Mirrool Parish is a civil parish of Sturt County, New South Wales.

The Parish is located at 34°08′54″S and 146°02′04″E just north of the town of Griffith, New South Wales in the Riverina Region.

The township of Mirrool, New South Wales is 80km to the east.

See also 
Mirrool Creek on the south side of Griffith
Mirrool, New South Wales

References

Localities in New South Wales
Sturt County